Dinarabad (also Romanized as Dīnārābād) Dinarabad is an affluent district in the Shahriar County, Tehran Province, Iran. At the 2006 census, its population was 5,109, in 1,229 families.

References 

Populated places in Shahriar County